Links is a series of golf simulation video games, first developed by Access Software, and then later by Microsoft after it acquired Access Software in 1999. Microsoft also produced its own series of golf games based on Links, under the title Microsoft Golf. The Links series was a flagship brand for Access, and was continued from 1990 to 2003. The first game in the series, Links: The Challenge of Golf, won Computer Gaming World'''s 1991 Action Game of the Year award.

Several versions of the game and expansion packs (containing new courses and golfers mainly) were created for the Mac and PC over the years. In 1996, Access Software introduced Links LS 1997, the first of several Links games to use the LS (Legends in Sports) title. A version for the Xbox named Links 2004 was released in November 2003. It would be the final game in the series. In March 2004, Microsoft announced the cancellation of its 2004 lineup of sports games, allowing the company to focus on improving such games. The company stated, "Links is something that we're taking a hard look at what we need to do." At the end of 2004, Microsoft sold Indie Built (formerly Access Software) to Take-Two Interactive. Indie Built was later shut down in 2006.

Many members of the development team now work for TruGolf, a golf simulator company based out of Centerville, Utah. In 2021, TruGolf re-acquired the rights to the Links series, re-releasing classic editions on GOG, as well as a new title, Links E6, the first in 17 years.

List of games
The following games were developed by Access Software
 Links: The Challenge of Golf (1990) Amiga, DOS, Sega CD
 Links 386 Pro (1992) DOS
 Links Pro (1993), the Macintosh version of Links 386 Pro Links LS 1997 (1996) DOS
 Links LS 1998 (1997) Microsoft Windows 95
 Links LS 1999 (1998) Windows

Microsoft produced the following games after its purchase of Access Software in 1999.
 Links Extreme (1999) Windows
 Links LS 2000 (1999) Windows
 Links 2001 (2000) Windows
 Links Championship Edition (2001) Windows (includes Links 2001, Links Expansion Pack, a course designer, a course converter and 4 new courses)
 Links 2003 (2002) Windows Microsoft Game Studios
 Links 2003 Championship Edition (2003) Windows (includes Links 2003 and Links 2003 Championship Courses)
 Links 2004 (2003) Xbox

Course disks
The following disks add additional courses to the main Links games.
 Links: Championship Course: Pinehurst Country Club (1991) DOS
 Links: Championship Course: Firestone Country Club (1991) Amiga, DOS
 Links: Championship Course: Hyatt Dorado Beach Resort (1991) DOS
 Links: Championship Course: Bay Hill Club & Lodge (1991) DOS
 Links: Championship Course: Bountiful Golf Course (1991) Amiga, DOS
 Links: Championship Course: Barton Creek (1991) DOS
 Links: Championship Course: Mauna Kea (1992) DOS
 Links: Championship Course: Troon North (1992) DOS
 Links: Championship Course: Banff Springs (1992) DOS
 Links: Championship Course: The Belfry (1992) DOS
 Links: Championship Course: Innisbrook - Copperhead (1993) DOS
 Links: Championship Course: Pebble Beach (1993) DOS
 Links: Championship Course: Bighorn (1994) DOS
 Links: Championship Course: Castlepines (1994) DOS
 Links: Championship Course: Prairie Dunes (1995) DOS
 Links: Championship Course: Cog Hill (1995) DOS
 Links: Championship Course: Riviera (1995) DOS
 Links: Fantasy Course: Devils Island (1995) DOS
 Links Championship Course: Pelican Hill (1996) DOS, Windows
 Links Championship Course: Valderrama (1997) Windows
 Links Championship Course: Oakland Hills (1997) Windows
 Links: Championship Course: Valhalla (1997) Windows
 Links Championship Course: Congressional Country Club (1998) Windows
 Links LS 2000 10-Course Pack (2000) Windows
 Links Expansion Pack (2001) Windows (for Links 2001)
 Links 2003 Championship Courses (2002) Windows
 Links Golf Courses Library (several versions)

Microsoft Golf
Before its purchase of Access Software, Microsoft published a series of golf games similar to Links, under the title Microsoft Golf. The first three games in the series are Windows-compatible versions of the early Links games, which were published for DOS. The first three entries in the Microsoft Golf series were developed by Access Software for Microsoft, and were sometimes labeled by publications as Links Lite. Microsoft subsequently published Microsoft Golf 1998 Edition and 1999 Edition, which were developed by Friendly Software as separate games not based on Links. After Access Software was acquired by Microsoft in 1999, Microsoft produced Microsoft Golf 2001 Edition, which was based on Links, and then discontinued the Microsoft Golf series to continue with the Links series. The following games were produced in the Microsoft Golf series:

 Microsoft Golf (1992) Windows 3.1
 Microsoft Golf: Multimedia Edition (1993) Windows 3.1
 Microsoft Golf 2.0 (1994) Windows 3.1/95
 Microsoft Golf 3.0 (1996) Windows 95
 Microsoft Golf 1998 Edition (1998) Windows 95
 Microsoft Golf 1999 Edition (1998) Windows 95
 Microsoft Golf 2001 Edition (2000) Windows 98

Reception

Computer Gaming World in 1996 ranked the 1990 version of Links fifth on the magazine's list of the most innovative computer games, stating that the game "may have inspired more 'business machine upgrades' than any other game". In 1996 Next Generation ranked it 69th on their "Top 100 Games of All Time", contending that "many prefer EA's PGA series, but Links takes the title by a hair's breadth. With real life courses, and enough stats, sliders, and options to choke a horse, Links re-creates everything but the swing (which is still accomplished with a 'three click' power bar)."

During 1999, Links LS 2000 sold 104,225 copies and earned $4.6 million in the United States. Links 2001 rose to 240,000 copies and $8.2 million in the United States by August 2006, which made it the 84th-best-selling computer game released between January 2000 and August 2006 in the region. Combined sales of all Links games released in the 2000s reached 720,000 copies in the United States by August 2006.

In the United States, Links Championship Edition sold over 100,000 copies by August 2006.

Links 2003 was a nominee for PC Gamer USs "2002 Best Sports Game" award, which ultimately went to Tiger Woods PGA Tour 2003. The magazine's Dan Morris called Links 2003 "a terrific game".

See also
 Leader Board
 Jack Nicklaus series

References

External links

Golf video games
Amiga games
DOS games
Classic Mac OS games
Microsoft franchises
Video game franchises introduced in 1990
Video games developed in the United States
Windows games
Xbox games